The 2024 United States presidential election in Ohio is scheduled to take place on Tuesday, November 5, 2024, as part of the 2024 United States elections in which all 50 states plus the District of Columbia will participate. Ohio voters will choose electors to represent them in the Electoral College via a popular vote. The state of Ohio has 17 electoral votes in the Electoral College, following reapportionment due to the 2020 United States census in which the state lost a seat.

Incumbent Democratic president Joe Biden has stated that he intends to run for reelection to a second term.

Primary elections

Republican primary

The Ohio Republican primary is scheduled to be held on March 19, 2024, alongside primaries in Arizona, Florida, and Illinois.

General election

Polling
Donald Trump vs. Joe Biden

Ron DeSantis vs. Joe Biden

See also 
 United States presidential elections in Ohio
 2024 United States presidential election
 2024 Democratic Party presidential primaries
 2024 Republican Party presidential primaries
 2024 United States elections

Notes

Partisan clients

References 

Ohio
2024
Presidential